Speed skating at the 2003 Asian Winter Games took place in the Nagane Park Speed Skating Rink located in the city of Hachinohe, Aomori Prefecture, Japan with nine events contested — five for men and four for women.

Schedule

Medalists

Men

Women

Medal table

Participating nations
A total of 63 athletes from 5 nations competed in speed skating at the 2003 Asian Winter Games:

References
Results of the Fifth Winter Asian Games
Results

 
2003 Asian Winter Games events
2003
Asian Games
Asian Games